Coligny is a maize farming town situated next to the railway line between Lichtenburg and Johannesburg in North West Province of South Africa.

History
Originally named Treurfontein, it was renamed Coligny when it became a town on 23July 1923, after Gaspard de Coligny, a Huguenot leader who died in the Massacre of St Bartholomew in 1572. Coligny was the scene of sporadic diamond mining activities.

Gerdau
The Concordia Congregation (also known as Gerdau congregation after the origin of its first missionary) on farm Hakbosvlaakte was founded in 1905 and thus is older than the town. The church ran Gerdauer Gemeinde-Schule, a German-language school that operated successfully for 53 years. This school was supported by German government and taught children from pre-school up to grade 7. In 1965 it had 2 teachers and 30 learners.

LAERSKOOL COLIGNY 
Is a school founded in 1968, the school has about 200 students as of  now. The school has 8 teachers, with 2 vice principles and a head principle. The school teaches from pre-school up to grade 7. The school only teaches Afrikaans.

2017 rioting and the Coligny sunflower case
On 25 April 2017, Coligny and nearby Lichtenburg were the scenes of extensive racial rioting following the death of Matlhomola Jonas Moshoeu / Mosweu (15) of the Scotland informal settlement in Tlhabologang, who was thought to have died at the hands of two white farm managers at Rietvlei farm. The violent protests, looting and petrol bombing resulted in the destruction of property and local businesses predominantly owned by whites, foreigners and other minorities. Rian Malan, in an investigation into the causes of the rioting, stated that the riots were further incited at Moshoeu's funeral by representatives of the SADTU and SANCO trade unions.

On 20 April 2017, the two Afrikaner men, Doorewaard and Schutte, came across Moshoeu and a second boy who were carrying 5 stolen sunflower heads. The boys ran away, abandoning the sunflower heads. Moshoeu was arrested by the farm managers and forced to take a seat on the back of the pickup truck. En route to the Coligny police station and 3 km from town, as the two men alleged, they were slowing at a turn in the road, when Moshoeu disappeared from the load body of the vehicle, and was assumed to have jumped off. Turning back, Moshoeu was found lying on the road, critically injured. A passer by was asked to look over him, as the two men proceeded to the police station where an ambulance was summoned. Moshoeu died of his injuries on his way to hospital in Lichtenburg.

On 24 April 2017 it was decided to charge the farm managers with murder. They handed themselves over to police on the 25th, and were charged and requested to hand over the pickup truck involved in the incident. They appeared before a magistrate court on 28 April 2017. Mattheus van Loggerenberg, the magistrate and resident of Coligny who was presiding over the case, noted that it was in the interest of justice that he recused himself from the case, citing that he feared for his life and that of his family. The case was postponed to 9 May 2017 for a formal bail application. Further incidences of violence ensued after the two co-accused were released on bail – a farmhouse was torched, a photographer was attacked and a confrontation erupted between the protesters and farmers. Judge Ronald Hendricks of the High Court in Mahikeng sentenced the two men, Doorewaard and Schutte, to 18 and 23 years respectively, after the testimony of the state witness, Mr Pakisi, was accepted.

However, on appeal, the men's conviction was overturned. The testimony of Mr Pakisi, the only evidence the State relied upon in their argument, was rejected as inconsistent and unreliable. At the places where Pakisi claimed he was shot at, no cartridge casings were found, and his timeline of events could not be reconciled with known times. In the bungled investigation, no blood stains or samples were found or collected in either the vehicle, any place Moshoeu was supposedly assaulted, or on the jersey which Pakisi supposedly used to wipe away Moshoeu's blood. It was found that the State did not prove its case beyond reasonable doubt, and Doorewaard and Schutte were acquitted of all charges after spending 13 months in jail. AfriForum funded the appeal costs, and its private prosecution unit provided support in the case investigation. In 2019 the Moshoeu family was donated a new house in Verdoorn Park, Coligny, by Gift of the Givers, on land donated by the Ditsobotla Local Municipality.

References

Populated places in the Ditsobotla Local Municipality
Populated places established in 1923
Populated places founded by Afrikaners